The 2020 New Mexico State Aggies football team represented New Mexico State University in the 2020 NCAA Division I FBS football season. The Aggies were led by eighth–year head coach Doug Martin and played their home games at Sun Bowl due to COVID-19 restrictions imposed by the state of New Mexico. They competed as an independent.

On August 13, 2020, New Mexico State suspended all sports competitions due to the COVID-19 pandemic. The Aggies played an abbreviated two-game season in February and March 2021.

Previous season
The Aggies finished the 2019 season 2–10 and did not qualify for a bowl game.

Schedule

Original

Revised

Personnel

Depth chart

Game summaries

Tarleton State

New Mexico Highlands (No Contest)

The New Mexico Highlands at New Mexico State game was canceled due to COVID-19 protocols and the game was not rescheduled.

Dixie State

References

New Mexico State
New Mexico State Aggies football seasons
New Mexico State Aggies football